The Molluginaceae are a family of flowering plants recognized by several taxonomists. It was previously included in the larger family Aizoaceae.  The APG III system of 2009 made no change in the status of the family as compared to the APG II system of 2003 and the APG system of 1998, apart from a reassignment of several genera, such as the placement of Corrigiola and Telephium into Caryophyllaceae, Corbichonia in Lophiocarpaceae, Microtea into Microteaceae and Limeum in Limeaceae, because the family was found to be widely polyphyletic in Caryophyllales. In addition Macarthuria was found not to be related to Limeum as previously thought and thus it was placed in Macarthuriaceae, and similarly species formerly placed in Hypertelis, apart from type species Hypertelis spergulacea, a true Molluginaceae, were found to belong elsewhere and were described as Kewa in the family Kewaceae, named for the Royal Botanic Gardens Kew.  Molluginaceae is still assigned to the order Caryophyllales in the clade core eudicots, although the generic circumscription is difficult because Mollugo is not monophyletic.

Genera
Molluginaceae in its current circumscription includes ca 9 genera and ca 80 known species
 Adenogramma   Rchb.
 Coelanthum    E.Mey. ex Fenzl
 Glinus        L.
 Glischrothamnus       Pilg.
 Hypertelis    E.Mey. ex Fenzl
 Mollugo       L.
 Pharnaceum    L.
 Polpoda       C.Presl
 Psammotropha  Eckl. & Zeyh.
 Suessenguthiella      Friedrich

Excluded genera
 Corbichonia   Scop. (now correctly placed in Lophiocarpaceae)
 Corrigiola    L. (now correctly placed in Caryophyllaceae)
 Kewa          Christenh. (correctly placed in Kewaceae)
 Limeum        L. (now correctly placed in Limeaceae)
 Macarthuria   Hugel ex Endl. (now correctly placed in Macarthuriaceae
 Orygia        Forssk. =  Corbichonia Scop. (Lophiocarpaceae)
 Semonvillea   J.Gay =  Limeum L. (Limeaceae)
 Telephium     L. (now correctly placed in Caryophyllaceae)

Genera listed in Tropicos
Tropicos currently includes 12 genera.

Notes:

References

External links

 links at CSDL

 
Caryophyllales families